Reed Eric Hundt (born March 3, 1948) is  an American attorney who served as chairman of the United States Federal Communications Commission from November 29, 1993 to November 3, 1997. Appointed by President Bill Clinton, he served for most of Clinton's first term. He was succeeded by William Kennard.

Hundt is the CEO and co-founder of the Coalition for Green Capital, a non-profit engaged in the creation of green banks in the United States and internationally, and Making Every Vote Count, a non-profit advocating to make the national popular vote relevant to selecting the President. He was also on the board of Intel Corporation 2001-20. He was a senior adviser to the law firm, Covington, in Washington, D.C., from 2014 to 2019, and lives in Bethesda, Maryland, and Portola Valley, California.

Biography 
Hundt attended high school in Washington D.C. at St. Albans School, graduating in 1965. He went to Yale College, where he majored in history, and worked on the Yale Daily News. Hundt taught school for several years before graduating from Yale Law School in 1974. He clerked for Harrison Lee Winter, a Baltimore judge on the United States Court of Appeals for the Fourth Circuit, before moving to Los Angeles, where he became the 85th lawyer at Latham & Watkins, one of the top law firms in the world.

In 1980, Hundt moved to the Latham & Watkins' Washington, D.C., office. In his litigation career at the firm, Hundt appeared in court in 48 states and the District of Columbia, argued appellate cases in almost all circuits, and handled cases in many topic areas, although he specialized in antitrust.

From 1983 Hundt supported Al Gore's political career. In 1992-3 he was part of the Clinton-Gore transition team, and chaired the committee that drafted the partly successful carbon tax introduced and passed in the House of Representatives in 1993. It was not passed through the Senate. In 1993 President Clinton, whom Hundt had known in law school, nominated Hundt to be chairman of the Federal Communications Commission. He was confirmed in November 1993.

Between 1998 and 2008, Hundt was a senior advisor to McKinsey, the consulting firm. He also served on many technology company boards from 1998 to the present, co-founded four firms (none of which was wildly successful), gave many speeches, wrote five books and numerous articles.

In popular culture 
Hundt is referenced by Dale Gribble in Season 4, Episode 10 ("Hillenium") of King of the Hill as the author of a "brilliantly written op-ed piece" about Y2K millennium.

In an episode of the original series of Animaniacs, Hundt is spoofed as "Reef Blundt".

Personal life 
He is married to Elizabeth "Betsy" Katz. They have three children.

Books

 You Say You Want A Revolution: A Story of Information Age Politics (Yale:2000)
 In China's Shadow: The Crisis of American Entrepreneurship (Yale: 2006), as part of the Future of American Democracy Foundation's Future of American Democracy Series
 Zero Hour: Time to Build the Clean Power Platform (Odyssey, 2013, ebook)
 The Politics of Abundance: How Technology Can Fix the Budget, Revive the American Dream and Establish Obama's Legacy, with Blair Levin (Odyssey: 2012, ebook)
 A Crisis Wasted: Barack Obama's Defining Decisions (Rosetta Books: 2019)

References

External links

 techliberation's commentary on Frontline's public interest comment filed with the FCC
 gigaom commentary on Frontline and the spectrum auction
 Reed Hundt bio at Public Knowledge

1948 births
American chief executives
Chairmen of the Federal Communications Commission
Clinton administration commissioners
Intel people
Living people
McKinsey & Company people
People from Ann Arbor, Michigan
St. Albans School (Washington, D.C.) alumni
The Blackstone Group people
Yale College alumni
Yale Law School alumni
Clinton administration personnel